Per Christensen (born  in Frederiksberg) is a Danish male curler and coach.

As a coach of Norwegian wheelchair curling team he participated in 2010.

Record as a coach of national teams

References

External links

Paralympic Team Norway - Olympiatoppen (page 27)

Living people
1955 births
Sportspeople from Frederiksberg
Danish male curlers
Danish curling coaches